José Gutiérrez de Agüera was a Spanish politician who acted as Minister of State in 1898, in a government headed by Práxedes Mateo Sagasta. He was born in Sanlúcar de Barrameda, and was elected deputy for the province of Cádiz in the elections of 1879 and 1881.

|-

|-

Foreign ministers of Spain
Year of birth missing
Year of death missing
Liberal Party (Spain, 1880) politicians